Virjibhai Thummar (born 31 May 1959) is a member of the Gujarat Legislative Assembly of India. He represents the Lathi constituency and is a member of the Indian National Congress.

External links
 Official biographical sketch in Parliament of India website

People from Gujarat
Indian National Congress politicians
India MPs 2004–2009
1959 births
Living people
Lok Sabha members from Gujarat
Indian National Congress politicians from Gujarat